Daum is a crystal studio based in Nancy, France, founded in 1878 by Jean Daum (1825–1885). His sons, Auguste Daum (1853–1909) and Antonin Daum (1864–1931), oversaw its growth during the burgeoning Art Nouveau period. Daum is one of the only  crystal manufacturers toe employ the pâte de verre (glass paste) process for art glass and crystal sculptures, a technique in which crushed glass is packed into a refractory mould and then fused in a kiln.

History 

The Daum family worked at the beginning of the Art Nouveau era and created one of France's most prominent glassworks. Established at the end of the 19th century, Daum’s renown was originally linked to the École de Nancy and the art of pâte-de-cristal, a major contributing factor in terms of its worldwide reputation.

During the Universal Exhibition of 1900 Daum was awarded a ‘Grand Prix’ medal. Daum glass became more elaborate. Acid etching (by Jacques Grüber) was often combined with carving, enamelling, and engraving on a single piece of glass to produce creative glass masterpieces. The most complicated creations also featured applied glass elements, such as handles and ornamental motifs in naturalistic forms. The Daum brothers soon became a major force in the Art Nouveau movement, seriously rivalling Gallé, so much so that when Émile Gallé died in 1904 they became the leaders in the field of decorative glass.

In 1906 Daum revived pâte de verre (glass paste), an ancient Egyptian method of glass casting, developing the method so that by the 1930s Daum's window panels used pâte de verre for richness instead of leaded or painted glass. Today Daum still uses this method to produce their pieces.

Locations 
Daum has always been linked with the city of Nancy. Its main manufacturing locations are in the downtown of Nancy and a nearby village called Vannes-le-Châtel. All the pieces are still handmade by hundreds of employees in the region.

Daum has a store at Place Stanislas in Nancy and Park Avenue in New York City.

Museum collection 
More than 600 glasswork items are in the Daum Collection at the Museum of Fine Arts of Nancy (Nancy Musée des Beaux-Arts), which documents the history of glass manufacturing.

Notable artists 
Since the peak of the Art Nouveau era, DAUM has worked with hundreds of artists and designers to create new collections. Among them were:

 Arman
 Hilton McConnico
 Philippe Starck
 Salvador Dalí
 Cyril Phan, aka Kongo
 Richard Texier
 Emilio Robba
 Philippe Druillet

References

External links 

 
 Daum sponsor of Paris Art Fair 2016

Daum (France)
Members of the École de Nancy
Victorian era
Art Nouveau
French brands